, known by the stage name , is a Japanese voice actress. Some of her major roles in anime are: Faury Carat in Tristia of the Deep Blue Sea, Chiaki Nakahara in Dai-Guard, Aihara in Angel Links and Komoe Harumachi in Eiken. In video games, she voices Aki Nitta in Soul Link, Remit Marlena in Eternal Melody, Ayaka Nanase in First Kiss Story and Uriko in the Bloody Roar series.

Filmography

Anime

Film

Video games

Drama CD

References

External links
 

1972 births
Living people
Voice actresses from Hiroshima
Japanese voice actresses
Japanese women pop singers
21st-century Japanese singers
21st-century Japanese women singers